Montana City may refer to:

 Montana City, Colorado
 Montana City, Montana